Bad Ems is a former Verbandsgemeinde ("collective municipality") in the Rhein-Lahn-Kreis, in Rhineland-Palatinate, Germany. In January 2019 it was merged into the new Verbandsgemeinde Bad Ems-Nassau. Its seat was in Bad Ems.

The Verbandsgemeinde Bad Ems consisted of the following Ortsgemeinden ("local municipalities"):

 Arzbach 
 Bad Ems
 Becheln
 Dausenau 
 Fachbach 
 Frücht 
 Kemmenau 
 Miellen 
 Nievern

Former Verbandsgemeinden in Rhineland-Palatinate
Rhein-Lahn-Kreis